The American Journal of Legal History is a peer reviewed, peer edited legal periodical.  It has appeared quarterly since 1957.  It was the first English-language periodical devoted solely to legal history.  Since 2016 it has been published by Oxford University Press.

Founding
The American Journal of Legal History was founded by Temple University law library director Erwin C. Surrency. The first issue appeared in February 1957. From its inception until 1982, the Journal was the official publication of the American Society for Legal History.

Purpose
According to Professor Surrency, the Journal was created to provide legal historians with a forum for their work and as a means of advancing the "law through a study of its history." As a peer publication, the Journal provides authors with "a more experienced editorial hand [and its] articles often are shorter, filled with less publish-or-perish tenure pieces than with an exchange of ideas between scholars."

The Journal was the first English-language periodical devoted solely to legal history.  The Journal publishes articles, essays, and book reviews on all aspects of legal history. Although a popular misconception is that the Journal’s coverage is limited to “American legal history,” the editors make it a point to regularly publish works on non-American legal history. The "American" part of the title denotes the journal's original location—in the United States—not the subject matter it publishes.

Personnel
The Journal, which was published from its founding in 1957 through 2015 by the Temple University Beasley School of Law in Philadelphia, Pennsylvania, had four editors during that time, all of whom were with Temple University’s law school:  Professor Surrency (1957–81); Professor Diane C. Maleson (1982-2002); Mr. Lawrence J. Reilly (2008 to 2014), and Professor Harwell Wells (2015). Beginning in 2016 the editors are Stefan Vogenauer and Alfred Brophy.  The book review editors are Lee Wilson and Matthew Dyson.
The Journal'''s international editorial board has more than twenty prominent legal historians. From 1957 to 1974, the honorary chair of the advisory board was Earl Warren, the former Chief Justice of the United States.

From 1974 to 2015, the Journal was printed by the George H. Buchanan Company of Logan Township, New Jersey.

Influence
Federal and state judges have cited the Journal in 125 published opinions. Scholars have cited the Journal in more than 3,000 articles and more than 15,000 books.

In their seminal work on the evolution of the growth of American legal history as a field of study, Professors William E. Nelson and John Phillip Reid noted that the  Journal is "a publication in which academic historians speak to each other . . . [and] virtually every one of the many articles in the Journal [is] essential reading for those wishing to keep current in the field."

Availability
Hard copies of the Journal can be purchased from W.S. Hein & Co., Inc.  Electronic copies of the Journal'' are available at the journal's website, as well as on EBSCO, HeinOnline, JSTOR, LexisNexis, and Westlaw.

References

External links

American law journals
Temple University
Publications established in 1957
Oxford University Press academic journals
Quarterly journals
English-language journals
Peer reviewed law journals